Spring Mills is an unincorporated community in Berkeley County, West Virginia, United States. Spring Mills is located along West Virginia Route 901.

Unincorporated communities in Berkeley County, West Virginia
Unincorporated communities in West Virginia